Chris McNulty (born 1953) is Australian-born jazz vocalist.

Career
McNulty began her professional career singing in pop bands in hotels and clubs in and around Melbourne, Australia. She toured Australia and SE Asia as a member of all the girl band Daughters of Zeus and several pop, funk, & R&B bands. She arrived in the United States in 1988, having been awarded an international study grant from the Music Board of the Australia Council. Two years later, her first U.S. album, Waltz for Debbie, was released. McNulty's original vocalisations for Miles Davis's "Blue in Green" became the song's official, published lyric (Warner Chapell, 1990).

She has worked with Paul Bollenback, Gary Bartz, Igor Butman, Tim Garland, Billy Hart, John Hicks, Ingrid Jensen, Peter Leitch, Mulgrew Miller, Ugonna Okegwo, Tony Reedus, Gary Thomas, Anita Wardell, and Matt Wilson.

She has performed at Smoke Jazz Club (2002), Jazz Standard (2006, 2007), Sweet Rhythm (2005, 2006, 2007), The Blue Note (2006), Jazz at Lincoln Center, Dizzy's Coca-Cola Club (2007), Kitano (February, 2008, June 9, 2010, August 2013), The Bar Next Door (2010, 2011, 2012, 2013, 2014), and 54 Below (2015). In 2006, she co-produced the first Belize Jazz Festival. From 2003–2010, she performed at venues in Russia and Ukraine with Paul Bollenback and Andrei Kondokov's trio. She has toured throughout the UK and Australia.

As an educator, McNulty has been invited to present clinics and workshops at Monash University (Melb), Griffith University (Bris), West Australian Academy of Performing Arts (WAAPA- Perth), Australian Institute of Music (AIM-Syd) and University of SA (Adelaide). McNulty's repertoire includes the great jazz standards, modern jazz classics and original compositions.

Awards and honors
Australian Bell Award, Best Australian Jazz Vocal Album, The Song That Sings You Here, 2013

Critical reception
"McNulty applies poignant jazz chops to the vocal, while accomplishing the impossible, the expression of her story through song...making listeners rethink the meaning of why we love jazz. Eternal is both easy to love, and profoundly touching" – 5 stars, All About Jazz NYC, July 2015

"McNulty has put all she has learned over half a lifetime of jazz singing and songwriting into this exquisite chamber jazz CD. A veteran performer on the international jazz scene, she has many gifts as a performer and a direct channel to the emotional core of a lyric. On this CD, McNulty bares her soul, and one doesn't dare look away." – 4 1/2 stars, DownBeat, June 2015

Discography
 Waltz for Debbie (Discovery, 1990)
 Time for Love (Amosaya, 1996)
 I Remember You (MopTop, 2002)
 Dance Delicioso (Elefant Dreams, 2005)
 Whispers the Heart (Elefant Dreams, 2006)
 The Song That Sings You Here (Challenge, 2012)
 Eternal (Palmetto, 2015)

References

1953 births
Australian women singers
Australian jazz composers
Australian jazz singers
Living people
Singers from Melbourne